Kim Tae-young was the 34th Chairman of the Joint Chiefs of Staff of the Republic of Korea Armed Forces and 42nd Republic of Korea Minister of National Defense.

Kim served as a Conscript in an Infantry Regiment that was deployed in Vietnam in the final stages of the Korean withdrawal from Vietnam. After his compulsory service he was recommended for Officer School, and  graduated from the Republic of Korea Military Academy in 1972 in the Self-Propelled Artillery branch. He has served as Commanding General, 6th Artillery Brigade (1997–1998), Commanding General, 35th Infantry Division (1999–2000), Commanding General, Capital Defense Command (2004–2005), and Chief Director, Joint Operations Headquarters, Joint Chiefs of Staff (2005–2006).

Prior to assuming the position of Chairman of the Joint Chiefs of Staff in 2008, he was Commanding General of the First ROK Army.

In September 2009, he replaced Lee Sang-Hee as the 42nd Republic of Korea Minister of National Defense.

Despite being considered as a good military officer with his skill from both inside and outside of the ROK military, he started to suffer strong criticism after the sinking of ROKS Cheonan. In May 2010, he offered his resignation to President Lee Myung-bak, although it wasn't accepted.
 
On 25 November 2010, he stepped down from his post as Minister of Defense in the wake of criticism he received for his handling of the shelling of Yeonpyeong.  The next day it was announced that his successor would be Kim Kwan-Jin, his JCS Chairmanship predecessor.

References

External links

 Republic of Korea Joint Chiefs of Staff (Korean)

South Korean generals
Living people
1949 births
Korea Military Academy alumni
Chairmen of the Joint Chiefs of Staff (South Korea)
National Defense ministers of South Korea
South Korean Buddhists
Sogang University alumni